Pearnel is a given name. Notable people with the name include:

Pearnel Charles (born 1936), Jamaican politician
Pearnel Patroe Charles Jr. (born 1978), Jamaican attorney and politician